Craig Key is an island city in the middle Florida Keys.

U.S. 1 (or the Overseas Highway) crosses the key at approximately mile marker 72, between Lower Matecumbe Key and Fiesta Key.

History
Craig Key was originally named Camp Panama, and was not a natural island, but a wide spot on the Overseas Railroad right-of-way. It was originally a vacation spot and flag stop on the railroad. Roland W. Craig leased the island from the railroad in the early 1930s, and by 1935 the island had been named Craig, Florida. Former president Herbert Hoover sailed his yacht out of Craig at times in the 1930s. The island's greatest claim to fame, however, is being the landfall site of the 1935 Labor Day Hurricane. The town was a total loss, but was rebuilt, and prospered as a vacation spot after the storm.

Originally a single island, two more man-made Keys were added, one to the southwest in 1955, and one to the northeast some time later. The name of the town was officially changed to "Craig Key" in 1971.

References

Islands of the Florida Keys
Islands of Monroe County, Florida
Islands of Florida